Mitcham and Morden is a constituency in Greater London represented in the House of Commons of the UK Parliament since 1997 by Siobhain McDonagh of the Labour Party.

History
The constituency was created in 1974 from the former seats of Mitcham and Merton & Morden.

Between 1974 and 1982 it was represented by Bruce Douglas-Mann who was elected as a Labour MP but defected in 1982 to the Social Democratic Party (SDP). Douglas-Mann was the sole SDP defector to resign his seat; he sought immediate re-election.

In the by-election Douglas-Mann triggered in May 1982, during the Falklands War, Angela Rumbold (Con) was elected. Rumbold's gain was the last time the Conservative Party would gain (as opposed to hold) at a by-election until 22 May 2008 when Edward Timpson won the Crewe and Nantwich by-election.

At the 1997 general election the seat was won by the Labour Party's Siobhain McDonagh. At the 2001, 2005 and 2010 General Elections, she was re-elected, in the latter election polling the 26th highest share of the vote for the party of the 631 seats contested.

The 2015 re-election of McDonagh made the seat the 41st safest of Labour's 232 seats by percentage of majority and 14th safest in the capital. The seat is one of the capital's two seats in which its majority in 2015 surpassed the Labour Party's landslide 1997 victory (the other being Ilford South).

Boundaries 

1974–1983: The London Borough of Merton wards Mitcham Central, Mitcham East, Mitcham North, Mitcham South, Mitcham West, Morden, and Ravensbury.

1983–2010:  Upon redrawing of most of the local government wards, the London Borough of Merton wards of Colliers Wood, Figge's Marsh, Graveney, Lavender, Longthornton, Lower Morden, Phipps Bridge, Pollards Hill, Ravensbury, and St Helier.

2010–present:  As above plus Cricket Green ward, minus Phipps Bridge

Constituency profile 
The seat is relatively dense suburban — predominantly the housing divides into terraced houses and low-rise apartments in southern parts of Tooting and Streatham at the northern end of the seat. In the south-west of the constituency is the most affluent part, Lower Morden. The name Mitcham and Morden is a partial misnomer — the area of the modern town centre around Morden tube station is in the Wimbledon constituency.

In the middle, the former coaching stop town of Mitcham with its ancient cricket green retains some village-like characteristics and had relatively poor transport connections until the opening of the Tramlink in 2000. In the 20th century, Mitcham became surrounded by modern council housing and light industry. Housing varies between the large rented sector, privately acquired properties much of which due to the Thatcher Ministry-introduced right to buy and significant dependence in certain areas on social housing.

Across the borough, around 40% of the population are ethnic minorities.

Members of Parliament

Election results

Elections in the 2010s

Elections in the 2000s

Elections in the 1990s

Elections in the 1980s

Elections in the 1970s

See also 
 List of parliamentary constituencies in London

Notes

References

External links 
Politics Resources (Election results from 1922 onwards)
Electoral Calculus (Election results from 1955 onwards)

Parliamentary constituencies in London
Constituencies of the Parliament of the United Kingdom established in 1974
Politics of the London Borough of Merton
Morden